William Ashurst may refer to:

Bill Ashurst (footballer) (1894–1947), English footballer
Bill Ashurst (1948–2022), rugby league footballer
William Henry Ashurst (judge) (1725–1807), English judge
William Henry Ashurst (solicitor) (1792–1855), English solicitor
William Ashurst (Roundhead) (1607–1656), English politician and soldier during the Interregnum
William W. Ashurst (1893–1952), United States Marine Corps general

See also
William Ashhurst (1647–1720), English politician and banker